3749 Balam  is a stony Flora asteroid and rare trinary system orbiting in the inner regions of asteroid belt. It also forms a secured asteroid pair with sub-kilometer sized asteroid . Balam was discovered on 24 January 1982, by American astronomer Edward Bowell at Lowell's Anderson Mesa Station near Flagstaff, Arizona, and received the prov. designation . It was named after Canadian astronomer David Balam. Its two minor-planet moons have an estimated diameter of 1.66 and 1.84 kilometers, respectively.

Orbit and classification 

Balam is a member of the Flora family, a very large group of stony asteroids in the inner main-belt. It orbits the Sun in the inner main-belt at a distance of 2.0–2.5 AU once every 3 years and 4 months (1,222 days). Its orbit has an eccentricity of 0.11 and an inclination of 5° with respect to the ecliptic.

Naming 

It is named after the Canadian astronomer David Balam, principal observer at Victoria's Climenhaga Observatory in British Columbia. The approved naming citation was published by the Minor Planet Center on 31 May 1988.

Physical characteristics 

The S-type asteroid has an albedo of 0.16. The body's rotation around its axis has been measured several times by different lightcurve observations with a concurring period of 2.8 hours.

Trinary asteroid

Outer satellite 

On 13 February 2002, the discovery of a minor-planet moon, provisionally designated , was announced by a team of researchers from SwRI, UA, JPL and OSUG, using the Gemini North Telescope on Mauna Kea in Hawaii. It has an estimated diameter of 1.84 kilometers. It orbits  km away in  days, with a high orbital eccentricity of ~ 0.9. The distant and highly eccentric orbit of S/2002 (3749) 1 suggests that it was likely captured by Balam.

Being such a small primary body in the inner main belt with a separation of over 100 primary radii, S/2002 (3749) 1 is the most loosely bound binary known. Balam has a Hill sphere with a radius of about 1,500 kilometers.

Inner satellite 

In March 2008, Franck Marchis discovered another companion, provisionally designated , making Balam a trinary asteroid.

Other known trinary asteroids include 45 Eugenia, 87 Sylvia, 93 Minerva, 107 Camilla, 130 Elektra and 216 Kleopatra.

Asteroid pair 

Asteroid pairs are on highly similar heliocentric orbits. At some point in the past, the pair of asteroids became gravitationally unbound due to rotational fission induced by the YORP-effect or from a collisional breakup of the parent body. After the discovery of Balams two satellites by Bill Merline (inner moon) and Franck Marchis (outer moon) in 2002 and 2008, respectively, Czech physicist David Vokrouhlický identified the unbound secondary in 2009. Based on backward orbit integrations, it is thought that Balam and  form a secured asteroid pair that became separated approximately 400,000 years ago.

Notes

References

External links 
 IAUC 7827
 Franck Marchis entry for 3749 Balam
 Orbits of Binary Asteroids with Adaptive Optics (VLT images)
 Lightcurve Database Query (LCDB), at www.minorplanet.info
 Asteroids and comets rotation curves, CdR – Geneva Observatory, Raoul Behrend
 
 

003749
Discoveries by Edward L. G. Bowell
Named minor planets
003749
19820124